The Garda National Immigration Bureau (GNIB; Irish: Biúró Náisiúnta an Gharda Síochána um Inimirce) is a unit of the Garda Síochána, the police force of the Republic of Ireland. It was formed in May 2000, and is responsible for the enforcement of immigration law in Ireland.

Formation and duties 
The GNIB was formed in May 2000, and is responsible for the execution of deportation orders, investigation of human trafficking complaints, investigation of language schools, countering illegal immigration and border control. It also provides support and assistance to local Garda immigration officers throughout the country.

It operates immigration checkpoints at Irish airports and ports, except at Dublin Airport, where the facilities are operated by the Irish Naturalisation and Immigration Service.

Organisation 
The GNIB is headquartered at Burgh Quay in Dublin 2, and reports to the Assistant Commissioner with responsibility for Special Crime Operations. Its staff includes two Detective Superintendents, four Detective Inspectors, 24 Detective Sergeants, 180 Detective Gardaí and Gardaí, and 68 civilian staff.

The Minister for Justice has responsibility for both the Irish Naturalisation and Immigration Service and the Garda National Immigration Bureau.

References 

Government agencies of the Republic of Ireland
Garda Síochána units